Lexington Hotel or Hotel Lexington may refer to:
 Lexington Hotel (Chicago), now demolished
 Lexington Hotel (New York City)
 Lexington Hotels & Inns, a brand operated by Vantage Hospitality